is a town located in Nishiusuki District, Miyazaki Prefecture, Japan.

As of October 1, 2019, the town has an estimated population of 3,656 and a density of 13.2 persons per km². The total area is 277.67 km².

Located next to the religio-historically significant town of Takachiho, Hinokage is known primarily for its three large bridges, traditional Kagura dances, and the work of Kazuo Hiroshima, a traditional weaver of bamboo baskets. Like many districts in rural Japan, the area has been struggling with an aging population and an exodus of young people to Tokyo and other major cities. The town's population peaked in the 1950s at 16,199 people, (Cort & Nakamura, 1994) but has steadily declined since the closure of the Mitate mine in March, 1970. (記念編纂部会, 1997)  Between 2000 and 2005 four area elementary and middle schools were closed, and more closures are planned in the future.

The region was heavily damaged in the September, 2005 Typhoon Nabi, and local rail service has been suspended indefinitely.

References
Cort, Louise Allison and Kenji Nakamura (1994). A Basketmaker in Rural Japan. Washington: Smithsonian Institution. .
記念誌編纂部会 (1997).  大空に翔ける: 日之影町立日之影中学校創立５０周年記念誌  日之影町:創立５０周年記念事業実行委員会.

External links

Hinokage official website 
Hinokage-town Sightseeing Guide

Towns in Miyazaki Prefecture